Carlton Township may refer to the following townships in the United States:

 Carlton Township, Tama County, Iowa
 Carlton Township, Michigan